South Africa was scheduled to compete at the 2016 Winter Youth Olympics in Lillehammer, Norway from 12 to 21 February 2016. The team consisted of one female athlete in alpine skiing.

Competitors

Alpine skiing

South Africa had qualified one girl.

Girls

See also
South Africa at the 2016 Summer Olympics

References

Nations at the 2016 Winter Youth Olympics
South Africa at the Youth Olympics
2016 in South African sport